Wings of Hope is a nonprofit organization that partners with organizations in ten countries outside of the U.S. to provide medical evacuation flights and access to health care for remote communities. Wings of Hope also provides free medical air transportation to people within a 900-mile radius of its St. Louis headquarters. Wings of Hope has been twice nominated for the Nobel Peace Prize and holds a 4-star (the highest) rating on Charity Navigator. In 2019, Wings of Hope directly served nearly 73,000 people worldwide.

History 
Wings of Hope was founded by four businessmen from St. Louis, Missouri: William Edwards, Joseph Fabick (Fabick Tractor Company), Paul Rodgers (V.P., Ozark Air Lines), and George Haddaway. The four  had heard of a young woman, Sister Michael Therese Ryan, who was the pilot of a small, fabric-covered Piper PA-18 Super Cub in the Turkana region of Kenya. The story of Sister Ryan using aircraft to bring relief to impoverished famine victims in a vast, remote region of Kenya inspired the men to raise money for a stronger, all-metal aircraft to better aid the effort.

After the founders raised the necessary capital for a new Cessna U206, legendary aviator Max Conrad piloted the plane across the Atlantic from St. Louis to Nairobi. The story was well-publicized and brought about a large response from the international community – from people seeking assistance and needing aircraft, to those who wanted to help by offering their time, money and services. From this initial effort of four men on a mission to help those in need, Wings of Hope has grown into a global aviation nonprofit working in 48 countries since its birth in 1963.

Programs 
Wings of Hope partners with local organizations in ten countries outside of the U.S., using aviation to help them deliver health care resources to isolated communities. As of 2021, Wings of Hope operated in Belize, Cambodia, Colombia, Ecuador, Haiti, Nicaragua, Papua New Guinea, Paraguay, Tanzania, and Zambia.

Medical Relief and Air Transport Program 
Through its Medical Relief and Air Transport Program, Wings of Hope provides free medical flights within a 900-mile radius of its St. Louis-area headquarters. In a typical year, the organization flies more than 200 patients and their caregivers to medical care.

Soar into STEM 
Wings of Hope's Soar into STEM program provides middle and high school students project-based learning connections to STEM curriculum, as well as education on Wings of Hope's activities.

Honorary Council 

 John Danforth, former United States senator
 Elizabeth Dole, former United States senator
 Carl Edwards, professional stock car driver
 Harrison Ford, actor and pilot
 Barrington Irving, pilot and STEM educator
 Sherrill Kazan, President of the World Council of Peoples for the United Nations
 Colin Powell, former Chairman of the Joint Chiefs of Staff and former Secretary of State
 Justin Francis Rigali, Archbishop Emeritus of Philadelphia
 Kurt Russell, actor and pilot
 Thomas P. Stafford, former astronaut
 Patty Wagstaff, aerobatic pilot

Awards and accolades 

 Lindbergh Award presented by the St. Louis section of the American Institute of Aeronautics & Astronautics (1993)
Adela Riek Scharr Medallion (1993)
Distinguished Achievement Award presented by The Wings Club (1995)
George Washington Honor Medal presented by the Freedoms Foundation at Valley Forge (1997)
Spirit of Chesterfield Award presented by the Chesterfield Chamber of Commerce (2004)
National Aeronautic Association National Public Benefit Flying Award (2004, 2006, 2007, 2011, 2012)
World Trade Center Saint Louis Global Ambassador Award (2005)
Health Care Heroes Award in Nursing category presented by the St. Louis Business Journal (2006)
Community Service Award presented by the William T. Kemper Foundation (2006)
CFO of the Year Award for the Small Nonprofit category presented by St. Louis Business Journal (2011)
What's Right with the Region presented by Focus St. Louis (2011)
Award of Achievement for Humanitarian Efforts presented by the Ninety-Nines, International Organization of Women Pilots (2012)
GuideStar Gold Participant
Nobel Peace Prize Nominee (2011 & 2012)
Ladue News Charity Awards Finalist (2015)
 3-star rating on Charity Navigator
 United Nations Humanitarian Award

References

External links 
 Wings of Hope

Health charities in the United States
Poverty-related organizations
Charities based in Missouri
Community-building organizations
Medical and health organizations based in Missouri